Von Zedtwitz is a surname. A family and notable people with the surname include:

House of Zedtwitz, old family of the nobility of Saxony
Max von Zedtwitz (born 1969), Swiss academic
Waldemar von Zedtwitz (1896–1984), German-born American bridge player and administrator
Von Zedtwitz Life Master Pairs, bridge competition named for Waldemar